Cystocoleus is a genus of lichen in the monotypic family Cystocoleaceae. Members of the genus are commonly called velvet lichens.

References

Lichen genera
Pleosporales